Ambas Bay is a bay of southwest Cameroon.

Geography
The bay opens towards the Gulf of Guinea. The port of Limbe lies on the shore of Ambas Bay.

History
Alfred Saker founded a settlement of freed slaves on the bay in 1858, which was later renamed Victoria. in 1884 Britain established the Ambas Bay Protectorate, of which Victoria was the capital. It was then ceded to Germany in 1887.

Colonial governors of Ambas Bay

See also
Communes of Cameroon

References

Bays of the Atlantic Ocean
Bodies of water of Cameroon
Gulf of Guinea
British colonial people in Cameroon
Government of Cameroon
Southwest Region (Cameroon)